Mulaku Atoll or Meemu Atoll(މުލަކަތޮޅު) is an administrative division of the Maldives. It corresponds to the natural atoll of the same name, also known as Mulak Atoll or 'Mulakatolhu'.

There is a mosque of historical value in Kolhufushi Island, but no Buddhist remains have been found on this atoll. Also of historic importance is the 1573 wreck of  Kalhuohfummi off the south eastern reef of Kolhuvaariyaafushi island.

NOTE: Haa Alifu, Haa Dhaalu, Shaviyani, Noonu, Raa, Baa, Kaafu, etc. (including Meemu) are code letters assigned to the present administrative divisions of the Maldives. They are not the proper names of the natural atolls that make up these divisions. Some atolls are divided into two administrative divisions while other divisions are made up of two or more natural atolls. The order meemu followed by the code letters is from North to South, beginning with the first letters of the Thaana alphabet used in Dhivehi. These code letters are not accurate from the geographical and cultural point of view. However, they have become popular among tourists and foreigners in the Maldives who find them easier to pronounce than the true atoll names in Dhivehi, (save a few exceptions, like Ari Atoll).

References 

 Divehi Tārīkhah Au Alikameh. Divehi Bahāi Tārikhah Khidmaiykurā Qaumī Markazu. Reprint 1958 edn. Malé 1990. 
 Divehiraajjege Jōgrafīge Vanavaru. Muhammadu Ibrahim Lutfee. G.Sōsanī.
 Xavier Romero-Frias, The Maldive Islanders, A Study of the Popular Culture of an Ancient Ocean Kingdom. Barcelona 1999.

Atolls of the Maldives
Administrative atolls of the Maldives